London Buses route 189 is a Transport for London contracted bus route in London, England. Running between Brent Cross and Marble Arch, it is operated by Metroline. The route currently runs as a 24-hour service.

History 
Route 189 commenced operation on 11 October 1997 running between Kilburn Park Station and Brent Cross Shopping Centre. The route was introduced to partially replace the withdrawn route 16A (which ran from Brent Cross to Oxford Circus). On 28 March 1998, the route was extended to Oxford Circus, still starting at Brent Cross.<

The route was converted from the original Alexander Dennis Enviro 400s to the New Routemaster, the route was one of the last to make the switch.

On 1 April 2017, the route was withdrawn between Orchard Street/Portman Street and Oxford Circus, and diverted to Marble Arch. The route was proposed to be withdrawn between Marble Arch and Belsize Road, furthermore, the route would have been extended to Camden Town replacing route 31. The night service would have been renumbered to N189 and would continue to run to Marble Arch. The suggested change was subject to lots of controversy as it would have deprived certain areas of direct bus access to Central London. On 23 November 2022, TFL decided to suspend the plans until further notice, keeping the initial Brent Cross - Marble Arch service.

Current route 
Route 189 operates via these primary locations:

 Brent Cross Shopping Centre 
 Cricklewood Broadway
 Kilburn Station 
 Brondesbury Station 
 Abbey Road
 St John's Wood
 Baker Street Station 
 Marble Arch

References 

Bus routes in London
Transport in the London Borough of Barnet
Transport in the City of Westminster
Transport for London